Kreuzjoch (German: cross col) is the name of many summits and several mountain passes, predominantly in the Eastern Alps.

Summits:
 Hohes Kreuzjoch, 2992 m, in the southern Ötztal Alps in South Tyrol
 Kreuzjochkogel, 2746 m, between the Sellrain Valley and the Oberinntal valley in the Stubai Alps
 Kreuzjoch (Samnaungruppe), 2698 m, near Spiss in the Samnaungruppe
 Kreuzjoch (eastern Sarntaler Alpen), 2560 m, near Franzensfeste in the Eisack Valley
 Kreuzjoch (Kitzbühel Alps), 2558 m, the highest point of the Kitzbühel Alps
 Kreuzjoch (Venet), 2464 m, part of the Venet range in the Ötztal Alps
 Kreuzjoch (Verwall), 2395 m, in the Verwall near Schruns in the Montafon
 Kreuzjoch (western Sarntaler Alpen), 2383 m, near the Hirzer in the Sarntal Alps
 Kreuzjoch (Rastkogelgruppe), 2336 m, above Hippach in the Tuxer Alps
 Mittleres Kreuzjoch, 2321 m, above the Fernpass in the Lechtal Alps
 Kreuzjoch (Montecroce), 2242 m, at the Brenner Pass in the Stubai Alps
 Östliches Kreuzjoch, 2231 m, above the Fernpass in the Lechtal Alps
 Kreuzjoch (Bschlaber Tal), 2185 m, near the Namloser Wetterspitze in the Lechtal Alps
 Kreuzjoch (Wettersteingebirge), 1719 m, above Garmisch-Partenkirchen in the Wettersteingebirge
 Kreuzjoch (Salzachgeier), 2071 m, part of the Salzachgeier in the Kitzbühel Alps

Mountain passes:
 Kreuzjoch (Sellrainer Berge), 2563 m, between the Oberinntal Valley and the Sellrain Valley, Stubaier Alpen
 Kreuzjoch (Pitztal), 2305 m, in the Ötztal Alps on the Kaunergrat range
 Kreuzjoch (Furcela de Furcia), 2293 m, in the Geislergruppe
 Kreuzjoch (Tuxer Kamm), 2178 m, near the Olperer in the Zillertal Alps
 Kreuzjoch (Stubai), 2136 m, in the Schlick 2000 ski area near Fulpmes 
 Kreuzjoch (Rettensteingruppe), 1619 m, between Spertental and Windauertal south-east of Kitzbühel